Spragueia is a genus of moths of the family Noctuidae. The genus was erected by Augustus Radcliffe Grote in 1875.

Species
 Spragueia apicalis Herrich-Schäffer, 1868
 Spragueia basipuncta Schaus, 1914
 Spragueia cleta Druce, 1889
 Spragueia creton Schaus, 1923
 Spragueia dama Guenée, 1852
 Spragueia funeralis Grote, 1881
 Spragueia grana Dognin, 1897
 Spragueia guttata Grote, 1875
 Spragueia jaguaralis Hampson, 1910
 Spragueia leo Guenée, 1852
 Spragueia lepus Guenée, 1852
 Spragueia magnifica Grote, 1882
 Spragueia margana Fabricius, 1794 (=Spragueia cuviana (Fabricius, 1798))
 Spragueia obatra Morrison, 1875
 Spragueia onagrus Guenée, 1852
 Spragueia pantherula Herrich-Schäffer, 1868
 Spragueia perstructana Walker, 1865
 Spragueia pyralidia Schaus, 1898
 Spragueia speciosa Draudt, 1936
 Spragueia turca Köhler, 1979
 Spragueia valena Druce, 1889

References

Acontiinae